is a Japanese football player who plays for Biwako Shiga.

Playing career
Enomoto was born in Chiba Prefecture on June 21, 1996. He joined J1 League club Nagoya Grampus in 2018.

Career statistics

Last update: 27 February 2019

References

External links

1996 births
Living people
Tokai Gakuen University alumni
Association football people from Chiba Prefecture
Japanese footballers
J1 League players
J2 League players
Nagoya Grampus players
Tokushima Vortis players
Ehime FC players
Association football forwards